Pukerimu  is a rural locality southwest of Cambridge in the Waipa District and Waikato region of New Zealand's North Island.

The name is Māori and comes from a rimu tree on a small hill (in Māori puke), which was a landmark for travellers before European settlement.

History
The area was densely populated and farmed by Māori before European settlement. The Waikato River allowed movement to other parts of the country. In 1864 as part of the Invasion of the Waikato, British forces landed at Pukerimu and built redoubts on each side of the river. From 1865, European settlers, some of them soldiers from the invasion, farmed the land.

A church was built in 1871 and shared between Methodists and Presbyterians. It moved to Kaipaki in 1901, and in 1928, it was replaced with a new church which was also used by Anglicans.

Education
Pukerimu School opened in 1876, but moved west to Kaipaki in 1920.

Demographics
The SA1 area is part of the larger Pukerimu statistical area.

The SA1 area had a population of 204 at the 2018 New Zealand census, an increase of 39 people (23.6%) since the 2013 census, and an increase of 69 people (51.1%) since the 2006 census. There were 72 households, comprising 102 males and 102 females, giving a sex ratio of 1.0 males per female. The median age was 41.7 years (compared with 37.4 years nationally), with 45 people (22.1%) aged under 15 years, 33 (16.2%) aged 15 to 29, 96 (47.1%) aged 30 to 64, and 30 (14.7%) aged 65 or older.

Ethnicities were 97.1% European/Pākehā, 8.8% Māori, 0.0% Pacific peoples, and 1.5% Asian. People may identify with more than one ethnicity.

Although some people chose not to answer the census's question about religious affiliation, 58.8% had no religion, 35.3% were Christian, 1.5% were Muslim and 1.5% had other religions.

Of those at least 15 years old, 33 (20.8%) people had a bachelor's or higher degree, and 24 (15.1%) people had no formal qualifications. The median income was $42,500, compared with $31,800 nationally. 45 people (28.3%) earned over $70,000 compared to 17.2% nationally. The employment status of those at least 15 was that 102 (64.2%) people were employed full-time, 30 (18.9%) were part-time, and 6 (3.8%) were unemployed.

Pukerimu statistical area

The statistical area had a population of 900 at the 2018 New Zealand census, an increase of 30 people (3.4%) since the 2013 census, and an increase of 168 people (23.0%) since the 2006 census. There were 318 households, comprising 462 males and 438 females, giving a sex ratio of 1.05 males per female. The median age was 39.2 years (compared with 37.4 years nationally), with 192 people (21.3%) aged under 15 years, 171 (19.0%) aged 15 to 29, 426 (47.3%) aged 30 to 64, and 108 (12.0%) aged 65 or older.

Ethnicities were 95.3% European/Pākehā, 7.7% Māori, 1.7% Pacific peoples, 2.7% Asian, and 1.7% other ethnicities. People may identify with more than one ethnicity.

The percentage of people born overseas was 22.7, compared with 27.1% nationally.

Although some people chose not to answer the census's question about religious affiliation, 53.3% had no religion, 38.3% were Christian, 0.3% were Muslim, 0.3% were Buddhist and 1.0% had other religions.

Of those at least 15 years old, 156 (22.0%) people had a bachelor's or higher degree, and 108 (15.3%) people had no formal qualifications. The median income was $41,500, compared with $31,800 nationally. 183 people (25.8%) earned over $70,000 compared to 17.2% nationally. The employment status of those at least 15 was that 426 (60.2%) people were employed full-time, 123 (17.4%) were part-time, and 24 (3.4%) were unemployed.

References

Waipa District
Populated places in Waikato